Baranagar Municipality is the civic body that governs Baranagar and its surrounding areas (Deshapriya Nagar, Bonhooghly, Sadhan Pally, Noapara, Palpara, Dunlop and Alambazar) in Barrackpore subdivision of North 24 Parganas district in West Bengal, India.

History
Baranagar, an ancient region of artisan people, is situated adjacent to Kolkata Municipal Corporation (KMC). The place is situated on the bank of the river Hooghly. Portuguese colonies at first established their business camp here which was in existence till 1862. Portuguese settlement became the seat of a Dutch trading station and an important anchorage for Dutch shipping. The Dutch had homes here in the seventeenth century. There was a hog factory where about 3,000 hogs a year were slaughtered and salted for export. Later it became the centre for the extensive jute trade, manufacturing gunny bags. In 1795, it was ceded to the British. Constituted as the Municipality of "North Suburban" in 1869, the Municipality was renamed "Baranagar" in 1889.

Healthcare
Baranagar Municipality has two hospitals named "Baranagar Matri Sadan" for women and "Eskag Sanjeevani Multispeciality Hospital". There is also a government hospital named "Baranagar State General Hospital" in Baranagar.

Elections
Baranagar Municipality has 34 wards (seats).

2022 West Bengal Municipality election

In the 2022 municipal elections for Baranagar Municipality, AITC won 32 seats, and CPI(M) 2 seats.

2015 West Bengal Municipality election

In the 2015 municipal elections for Baranagar Municipality, AITC won 32 seats, and CPI(M) 2 seats.

2010 West Bengal Municipality election
In the 2010 municipal elections for Baranagar Municipality, AITC won 20 seats, CPI(M) 11 seats, INC 2 seats, and CPI 1 seat.

See also
 List of municipal corporations in India

References

External links

 

Baranagar
Municipalities of West Bengal
Government buildings completed in 1869
Infrastructure completed in 1869
1869 establishments in British India
Organisations based in Kolkata
Buildings and structures in Kolkata